The BiP internal ribosome entry site (IRES) is an RNA element present in the 5' UTR of the mRNA of BiP protein and allows cap-independent translation. BiP protein expression has been found to be significantly enhanced by the heat shock response due to internal ribosome entry site (IRES)-dependent translation. It is thought that this translational mechanism is essential for the survival of cells under stress.

References

External links 
 

Cis-regulatory RNA elements